The United Kingdom uses Greenwich Mean Time or Western European Time (UTC) and British Summer Time or Western European Summer Time (UTC+01:00).

History
Until the advent of the railways, the United Kingdom used local mean time. Greenwich Mean Time was adopted first by the Great Western Railway in 1840 and a few others followed suit in the following years. In 1847 it was adopted by the Railway Clearing House, and by almost all railway companies by the following year. It was from this initiative that the term "railway time" was derived.

It was gradually adopted for other purposes, but the legal case of Curtis v March in 1858 held "local mean time" to be the official time. On 14 May 1880, a letter signed by 'Clerk to Justices' appeared in 'The Times', stating that 'Greenwich time is now kept almost throughout England, but it appears that Greenwich time is not legal time. This was changed later in 1880, when Greenwich Mean Time was legally adopted throughout the island of Great Britain under the Statutes (Definition of Time) Act 1880 (43 & 44 Vict.). GMT was adopted on the Isle of Man in 1883, Jersey in 1898, and Guernsey in 1913. Ireland adopted GMT in 1916, supplanting Dublin Mean Time.

Daylight saving time was introduced by the Summer Time Act 1916 (6 & 7 Geo. V), which was implemented in 1916 as GMT plus one hour and Dublin Mean Time plus one hour. The length of DST could be extended by Order in Council, and was extended for the duration of World War I. For 1916, DST extended from 21 May to 1 October, with transitions at 02:00 standard time. On 1 October 1916, Greenwich Mean Time was introduced to Ireland.

At the beginning of the 20th century, Sandringham Time (UTC+00:30) was used by the royal household. This practice was abolished by King Edward VIII in an effort to reduce confusions over time.

In the summers of 1941 to 1945, during the Second World War, Britain was two hours ahead of GMT and operating on British Double Summer Time (BDST). To bring this about, the clocks were not put back by an hour at the end of summer in 1940 (BST having started early, on 25 February 1940). In subsequent years, clocks continued to be advanced by one hour each spring (to BDST) and put back by an hour each autumn (to BST). On 15 July 1945, the clocks were put back by an hour, so BDST reverted to BST; the clocks were put back by an additional hour on 7 October 1945, so BST reverted to GMT for the winter of 1945.

The United Kingdom experimentally adopted Central European Time by maintaining Summer Time throughout the year from 1968 to 1971. In a House of Lords debate, Richard Butler, 17th Viscount Mountgarret said that the change was welcomed at the time, but the experiment was eventually halted after a debate in 1971, in which the outcome might have been influenced by a major accident on the morning of the debate. Proposals to adopt CET have been raised by various politicians over the years, including a proposal in 2011 to conduct an analysis of the costs and benefits.

The dates of British Summer Time are the subject of the Summer Time Act 1972. From 1972 to 1980, the day following the third Saturday in March was the start of British Summer Time (unless that day was Easter Sunday, in which case BST began a week earlier), with the day following the fourth Sunday in October being the end of British Summer Time. From 1981 to 2001, the dates were set in line with various European Directives. Since 2002 the Act has specified the last Sunday in March as the start of British Summer Time with the last Sunday in October being end of British Summer Time.

Since 1998 the start and end date are the same in both the United Kingdom and the European Union.

Future

A proposal to repeal European Directive 2000/84/EC and require that member states observe their own choice of time year-round was initiated in September 2018. The United Kingdom left the EU before this reform became effective; the UK is subsequently free to make its own arrangements. , the UK Government had "no plans" to end daylight saving.

In July 2019, the House of Lords EU Internal Market Sub-Committee launched a new inquiry into the implications for the UK of the European changes, to "explore what preparations the Government needs to make and what factors should inform the UK's response."

Decentralisation 
Authority over the time zone in Northern Ireland can be legislated by the Northern Ireland Assembly but the power has never been used, as the Republic has followed the UK.  In Scotland and Wales, time zone is a reserved matter, meaning that only the Parliament of the United Kingdom has power to legislate.

IANA time zone database
The IANA time zone database contains one zone for the United Kingdom in the file zone.tab, named Europe/London.
This refers to the area having the ISO 3166-1 alpha-2 country code "GB". The zone names Europe/Guernsey, Europe/Isle_of_Man and Europe/Jersey exist because they have their own ISO 3166-1 alpha-2 but the zone.tab entries are links to Europe/London. There are several entries for UK possessions around the world.

Data directly from zone.tab of the IANA time zone database. Columns marked with * are the columns from zone.tab itself.

British territories

See also
Lists of time zones
Summer time in Europe

References

External links
Archive of Summer time dates from the National Physical Laboratory
1880 Definition of time act.